Bobby Bhatia (born 12 June 1973) is an Indian tech entrepreneur and investor based in Singapore. He is the CEO and Founder of TrakInvest. After working for 20 years in the investment sector, Bobby Bhatia founded TrakInvest in 2013.

Early life and education

Bobby was on 12 June 1973 in New Delhi, India. At the age of 9 his family moved to Kuwait where he attended the American School of Kuwait. Bobby developed an interest in business and finance in his youth and got selected in Young Scholar's Program at Stanford University in 1989. He attended and graduated in Economics with Honours from Duke University.

Initial career

Bobby Bhatia began his career with O’Connor & Associates, a Chicago-based options trading firm. After the acquisition of O’Connor & Associates by Swiss Bank Corporation, Bobby worked in various departments of this associate program.  In 1995, Bobby joined Solomon Brothers as a derivatives trader. In 1998, he joined Chase Capital Partners (CCPA), which was later renamed JP Morgan Partners.  In 2006, Bobby joined AIG as Managing Director & Head of Principal Investments. Bobby has held board and advisory positions in Sentinel Capital, Palma Capital (UAE), Asia Virtual Pay (China), Livesports and SparkLabs (Korea).

TrakInvest

In 2010, Bobby relocated his operations and investments headquarters to Singapore and turned into an entrepreneur., and in 2013 conceptualized his own venture called TrakInvest, a Singapore-based virtual social trading platform. TrakInvest provides analytical tools and sentiment indicators to investors, and aims at teaching investments as a life skill. In early 2017, TrakInvest launched the first virtual trading reality show on YouTube. In November–December 2017, the company moved onto Blockchain technology and also launched its own cryptocurrency called TRAK tokens.

References

Businesspeople from Delhi
1973 births
Living people